Mark Andrew Tournier (born 3 May 1971) is an Australian cricketer.  Tournier is a right-handed batsman who bowls right-arm fast-medium.  He was born in Melbourne, Victoria.

Tournier made his first-class debut for British Universities in 2000 against the touring Zimbabweans.  He played 2 further first-class matches for the team against the touring Pakistanis in 2001 and the touring Sri Lankans in 2002. In his 3 first-class matches, he scored 23 runs at a batting average of 11.50, with a high score of 13. With the ball he took 9 wickets at a bowling average of 34.33, with a single five-wicket haul which gave him best figures of 5/88.

Tournier represented the Nottinghamshire Cricket Board in a single List A match against Cumberland in the 1st round of the 2003 Cheltenham & Gloucester Trophy which was played in 2002. In his only List A match he scored 25 runs and with the ball he took 2 wickets at a bowling average of 16.50, with figures of 2/33.

He has played club cricket for Knypersley Cricket Club in the Derbyshire Premier Cricket League.

References

External links

1971 births
Living people
Cricketers from Melbourne
Australian cricketers
Nottinghamshire Cricket Board cricketers
Australian expatriate sportspeople in England
British Universities cricketers
Derbyshire Cricket Board cricketers